Krouse is a surname. Notable people with the surname include:

Bob Krouse (born 1943), Canadian football player
Ray Krouse (1927–1966), American football player
P.J. Krouse (1877–1944), American architect
Rodger Krouse (born 1961), American businessman

See also
Krouse v. Graham, United States tort case law
Krouse v. Chrysler Canada Ltd., Canadian copyright case law